Maria Bard (7 July 1900 – April 1944) was a German stage actress, who made a handful of films in the silent era for Rimax, her first husband Wilhelm Graaff's company. 

By 1930, her marriage with Graaff was over, and she appeared with Werner Krauss in the stage production Der Kaiser von Amerika or The King of America and the two became involved. Krauss' wife discovered their affair and committed suicide; a year later, in 1931, Maria Bard married Krauss. Her third husband was actor Hannes Stelzer. 
Bard committed suicide in April 1944, reportedly for political reasons.

Selected filmography
 Berlin-Alexanderplatz (1931)
 Man Without a Name (1932)
 Premiere (1937)
 Capers (1937)
 Above All Else in the World (1941)

References 
 Thomas Elsaesser and Michael Wedel, The BFI Companion to German Cinema, British Film Institute: London, England, 1999.

External links 
 

1900 births
1944 deaths
People from Schwerin
20th-century German actresses
1944 suicides